Three ships of the Royal Navy have been named HMS Belleisle after Belle Île off the coast of Brittany:

  was a 64-gun ship of the line of the French Navy, launched in 1760. Captured by the Royal Navy on 3 April 1761, and commissioned as the third-rate HMS Belleisle.
  was a French 74-gun third-rate ship of the line named Formidable captured in 1795 near Belle Île. She fought at the Battle of Trafalgar and was broken up in 1814.
  was a 74-gun third rate launched in 1819 and broken up in 1872.
  was the lead ship of her class of ironclad battleship, originally built for the Ottoman Empire as Peiki Shereef, but purchased in 1876, used as a coast defense ship and expended as a target ship in 1903.
 A destroyer named Belleisle was launched in 1946 but never completed.

See also

References
 

Royal Navy ship names